Zealandopterix zonodoxa is a moth of the family Micropterigidae. It endemic to New Zealand and is found from the Hawkes Bay north as well as on Poor Knights, Little Barrier and Great Barrier Islands. It is the smallest micropterigid in New Zealand and the shiny white markings on the forewing of this species are variable. It is a day flying moth, but has been collected using UV light. Adults are on the wing from September to March and the species has been witnessed visiting the flowers of Nikau and Cordyline pumilio in large numbers. It inhabits a wide variety of moist indigenous forest but is associated with forests in which podocarps are common. Larvae have been sieved from rotten wood on the floor of a mixed podocarp/broadleaf forest or extracted from moss or from bryophytes.

Taxonomy
Zealandopterix zonodoxa was first described by Edward Meyrick in 1888 as Palaeomicra zonodoxa using specimens collected in the Waitākere ranges in December. In 1912 Meyrick placed this species within the Sabatinca genus. George Hudson discussed and illustrated this species under this name in his 1928 book The butterflies and moths of New Zealand. In 1988 this placement was also confirmed by J. S. Dugdale in his Catalogue of New Zealand Lepidoptera. In 2010 Gibbs synonymised this species with S. rosicoma, and placed it in the newly created genus Zealandopterix. The lectotype specimen is held in the Natural History Museum, London.

Description

Meyrick originally described the species as follows:

The forewing ground colour is dark brownish-black with strong purplish-bronze reflections. There is a maximum of five and a minimum of three shining white fasciae comprising: a short basal triangular streak, which is consistently present, in the centre of the wing, contiguous with the tegula. Secondly, a transverse band at mid-length, either as a continuous broad line or only partly represented in the form of either a bold triangular patch on the dorsum or triangular patches on both the costa and the dorsum. Furthermore, a much smaller costal patch and a few white scales in the apex present in all specimens. The fringes are long along the termen and largely dark brownish-black, white-tipped and wholly white around the apex. The hindwing is greyish-brown with bronzy-purple reflections. The fringes are grey-brown.

This is the smallest micropterigid in New Zealand. The shiny white markings on the forewing of this species are variable.

Distribution
This species is endemic to New Zealand. It is known from the northern North Island of New Zealand, from Te Paki south to Puketitri, Hawkes Bay and including Poor Knights, Little Barrier and Great Barrier Islands.

Behaviour
Z. zonodoxa is a day flying moth and have been seen visiting the flowers of Nikau and Cordyline pumilio in large numbers. This species has been collecting using UV light. Adults are on the wing between September and March.

Hosts and habitat
This species inhabits a wide variety of moist indigenous forest types but is associated with forests in which podocarps are common. Larvae have been sieved from rotten wood on the floor of a mixed podocarp/broadleaf forest or extracted from moss or from bryophytes.

Reference

Micropterigidae
Moths described in 1888
Endemic fauna of New Zealand
Moths of New Zealand
Taxa named by Edward Meyrick
Endemic moths of New Zealand